Vakaga is one of the 16 prefectures of the Central African Republic. Its capital is Birao. It covers an area of 46,500 km and has a population of 37,595 (2003 census). The extremely low population density, less than 1 person/km, is a result of the capture of the majority of the region's inhabitants by slave-traders from the Sudan in the second half of the nineteenth century. Vakaga is known for its oil reserves.

Notable people
Michel Djotodia, 5th President of the Central African Republic

References

Vakaga
Prefectures of the Central African Republic